IPSI may refer to:
 International Peace and Security Institute
 Ipsilateral, an anatomical term of location
 Irish Progressive Services International